Ee Sabdam Innathe Sabdam is a 1985 Indian Malayalam-language rape and revenge film, directed by P. G. Viswambaran, written jointly by Sharada and John Paul and produced by K. P. Kottarakara. The film stars Mammootty in the lead role, while Shobana, Rohini, Captain Raju and Vijayraghavan play supporting roles. It is loosely based on the I Spit On Your Grave film series.  The film was a blockbuster and was one of the biggest hits of the year.

Plot
A group of boys stalks and harasses their neighbor, Dr. Ramachandran and his wife, Sharada, who complain to the police against them a few times. Sharada is raped and murdered by them after keeping Dr. Ramachandran as hostage. They also rape his sister and she loses her mental balance. Ramachandran seeks vengeance and becomes a vigilante against his wife's killers.

Cast
Mammootty as  Dr. Ramachandran 
Shobana as  Dr. Sharada 
Rohini as  Pushpa 
Captain Raju as  SP Gopinathan IPS
Vijayaraghavan as  Balu 
Shivaji as  Chandru 
Kalabhavan Ansar   
Sreelatha Namboothiri
Azeez as  SI Raveendran 
Jose Prakash as  MP Nandan Menon 
C. I. Paul as  Advocate 
Jagannatha Varma as  Police Officer 
Jagathi Sreekumar as  Nanukuttan Pillai
K. P. Kumar as Arun Kumar

Soundtrack 
The music was composed by Shyam and the lyrics were written by Poovachal Khader.

References

External links

1980s Malayalam-language films
Indian rape and revenge films
Indian vigilante films
Indian films about revenge
Films directed by P. G. Viswambharan